WDIC may refer to:

WDIC (AM), a defunct radio station (1430 AM) formerly licensed to serve Clinchco, Virginia, United States
WDIC-FM, a radio station (92.1 FM) licensed to serve Clinchco, Virginia